Ireland v. Australia may refer to:
International Rules Series
History of rugby union matches between Australia and Ireland